The West Schoolhouse is a historic school building at 61 Whig Street in Dennis, Massachusetts.  Built c. 1770–75, this one-room schoolhouse is the oldest in Dennis.  It served as a schoolhouse until 1865, and was moved to its present location in 1973.  It is the only one of Dennis's twelve district schools that is still standing.  It is now on the grounds of the Josiah Dennis House, a museum property operated by the Dennis Historical Society.

The building was listed on the National Register of Historic Places in 1975.

See also
National Register of Historic Places listings in Barnstable County, Massachusetts

References

External links
Old West Schoolhouse web site

Schoolhouses in Massachusetts
Schools in Barnstable County, Massachusetts
School buildings on the National Register of Historic Places in Massachusetts
National Register of Historic Places in Barnstable County, Massachusetts